Robert Henryson (Middle Scots: Robert Henrysoun) was a poet who flourished in Scotland in the period c. 1460–1500. Counted among the Scots makars, he lived in the royal burgh of Dunfermline and is a distinctive voice in the Northern Renaissance at a time when the culture was on a cusp between medieval and renaissance sensibilities. Little is known of his life, but evidence suggests that he was a teacher who had training in law and the humanities, that he had a connection with Dunfermline Abbey and that he may also have been associated for a period with Glasgow University. His poetry was composed in Middle Scots at a time when this was the state language. His writing consists mainly of narrative works. His surviving body of work amounts to almost 5000 lines.

Works

Henryson's surviving canon consists of three long poems and around twelve miscellaneous short works in various genres. The longest poem is his Morall Fabillis, a tight, intricately structured set of thirteen fable stories in a cycle that runs just short of 3000 lines. Two other long works survive, both a little over 600 lines each. One is The Tale of Orpheus and Erudices his Quene, his dynamic and inventive version of the Orpheus story. The other is his Testament of Cresseid, a tale of moral and psychological subtlety in a tragic mode founded upon the literary conceit of "completing" Criseyde's story-arc from Chaucer's Troilus and Criseyde. Emily Wingfield has explored its significance in relation to the deployment of the Trojan Legend in political discourse between England and Scotland.

The range of Henryson's shorter works includes Robene and Makyne, a pastourelle on a theme of love, as well as a bawdy passage of comic flyting which targets the medical practises of his day, a highly crafted and compressed poem of Marian devotion, some allegorical works, some philosophical meditations, and a prayer against the pest. As with his longer works, his outward themes often carry important subtexts. 

Constructing a sure chronology for Henryson's writings is not possible, but his Orpheus story may have been written earlier in his career, during his time in Glasgow, since one of its principal sources was contained in the university library. Internal evidence has been used to suggest that the Morall Fabillis were composed during the 1480s.

Biographical inferences

There is no record of when or where Henryson was born or educated. The earliest found unconfirmed reference to him occurs on 10 September 1462, when a man of his name with license to teach is on record as having taken a post in the recently founded University of Glasgow. If this was the poet, as is usually assumed, then the citation indicates that he had completed studies in both arts and canon law.

Almost all early references to Henryson firmly associate his name with Dunfermline. He probably had some attachment to the city's Benedictine abbey, the burial place for many of the kingdom's monarchs and an important centre for pilgrimage close to a major ferry-crossing en route to St Andrews. Direct unconfirmed evidence for this connection occurs in 1478 when his name appears as a witness on abbey charters. If this was the poet, then it would establish that one of his functions was as notary for the abbey, an institution which possessed and managed a vast portfolio of territory across Scotland. 

The almost universal references to Henryson as schoolmaster are usually taken to mean that he taught in and had some duty to run the grammar school for Dunfermline's abbatial burgh. A partial picture of what this meant in practice may be derived from a confirmatio of 1468 which granted provision to build a "suitable" house for the habitation of a "priest" (as master of grammar) and "scholars" in Dunfermline, including "poor scholars being taught free of charge". 

Dunfermline, as a royal burgh with capital status, was routinely visited by the court with residences directly linked to the abbey complex. There is no record of Henryson as a court poet, but the close proximity makes acquaintance with the royal household likely. He was active during the reigns of James III and James IV, both of whom had strong interests in literature. 

According to the poet William Dunbar, Henryson died in Dunfermline. An apocryphal story by the English poet Francis Kynaston in the early 17th century refers to the flux as the cause of death, but this has not been established. The year of death also is unknown, although c.1498-9, a time of plague in the burgh, has been tentatively suggested. However, Dunbar gives the terminus ad quem in a couplet (usually considered to have been composed c.1505) which simply states that Death in Dunfermelyne ...hes done roune (has whispered in private)with Maister Robert Henrysoun.
(William Dunbar, Lament for the Makaris, lines 81–2)

Almost nothing else is known of Henryson outside of his surviving writing. It is not known if he originated from Dunfermline and a suggestion that he may have been linked to the Fife branch of the Clan Henderson is not possible to verify, although his name is certainly of that ilk.

General style

Henryson generally wrote in a first-person voice using a familiar tone that quickly brings the reader into his confidence and gives a notable impression of authentic personality and beliefs. The writing stays rooted in daily life and continues to feel grounded even when the themes are metaphysical or elements are fantastic. His language is a supple, flowing and concise Scots that clearly shows he knew Latin, while scenes are usually given a deftly evocative Scottish setting which can only have come from close connection and observation. This detailed, intimate and realistic approach, at times, strongly suggests matters of personal experience and attitudes to actual contemporary events, yet the specifics remain elusive in ways that tantalise readers and critics. Some of this sense of intrigue may be in part accidental, but it is also heightened by his cannily controlled application of a philosophy of fiction, a frequently self-proclaimed feature of the work. 

No concrete details of his life can be directly inferred from his works, but there are some passages of self-reflection that appear to contain autobiographical implications, particularly in the opening stanzas of his Testament of Cresseid.

Henryson's Scots

Henryson wrote using the Scots language of the 15th century. This was in an age when the use of vernacular languages for literature in many parts of Europe was increasingly taking the place of Latin, the long-established lingua franca across the continent.

Extant poems

All known and extant writings attributed to Robert Henryson are listed here. In addition, the scholar Matthew P McDiarmid identified from an index a lost poem by Henryson which began: On fut by Forth as I couth found (not listed below).

Long works

 The Morall Fabillis of Esope the Phrygian (See below for list of individual fables in the cycle) The Tale of Orpheus and Erudices his Quene The Testament of CresseidShort works

 Robene and Makyne Sum Practysis of Medecyne The Annuciation Ane Prayer for the Pest The Garment of Gud Ladeis The Bludy Serk The Thre Deid-Pollis Against Hasty Credence The Abbay Walk The Praise of Age The Ressoning Betwix Aige and Yowth The Ressoning Betwix Deth and ManIndividual fables

Seven of the stories in Henryson's cycle are Aesopian fables derived from elegiac Romulus texts, while the other six (given in italics) are Reynardian in genre. The three titles given with bold numbers provide evidence for the integral unity of the overall structure. 

 01 The Cock and the Jasp
 02 The Twa Mice
 03 The Cock and the Fox 04 The Confession of the Tod 05 The Trial of the Tod 06 The Sheep and the Dog
 07 The Lion and the Mouse
 08 The Preaching of the Swallow
 09 The Fox the Wolf and the Cadger 10 The Fox the Wolf and the Husbandman 11 The Wolf and the Wether 12 The Wolf and the Lamb
 13 The Paddock and the Mouse

Bibliography
 Gray, Douglas (1979), Robert Henryson, E.J. Brill, 
 Barron, W.R.J. (ed.) (1981), Robert Henryson: Selected Poems, Carcanet New Press 
 McDiarmid, Matthew P. (1981), Robert Henryson, Scottish Academic Press, 
 Fox, Denton (ed.) (1981), The Poems of Robert Henryson, Clarendon Press, 
 David Murison (ed.) (1989), Selected Poems by Robert Henryson, The Saltire Society, 
 Fleming, Morna (ed.) (2003), The Flouer o Makarheid, The Robert Henryson Society, Dunfermline
 Wingfield, Emily (2014), The Trojan Legend in Medieval Scottish Literature, D.S. Brewer, 

See also
Scotland's Education Act of 1496
Scotland in the Late Middle Ages
Scotsoun

Notes and references

External links

Dunfermline's Carnegie Public Lending Library has a special Henryson collection which can be consulted by appointment.
Britain in Print has an online audio recording of Henryson's The Testament of Cresseid'' read by Colin Donati and Dr Morna Fleming among its resources.
Robert Henryson Society homepage
The Chepman & Myllar Prints digital edition at the National Library of Scotland contains the following works by Henryson:
The Praise of Age
Orpheus and Eurydice
The Want of Wise Men

More information can also be found at 
Robert L. Kindrick, 'The Morall Fabillis: Introduction"
Writers' Museum in Edinburgh commemorates Robert Henryson in its Makars' Court in Lady Stair's Close. Selections for Makars' Court are made by The Writers' Museum, The Saltire Society and The Scottish Poetry Library.

Scottish Renaissance writers
Middle Scots poets
Scots Makars
1420s births
1500s deaths
 
Fabulists
Lallans poets
Scottish educators
Robert
People associated with Fife
People associated with the University of Glasgow
People from Dunfermline
Alumni of the University of St Andrews
15th-century Scottish poets
15th-century Scottish writers